The 2017 Women's South American Volleyball Championship was the 32nd edition of the Women's South American Volleyball Championship held in Cali, Colombia and organised by South America's governing volleyball body, the Confederación Sudamericana de Voleibol (CSV).  The champions will qualify for 2018 FIVB Volleyball Women's World Championship.

Competing nations
The following national teams participated:

Round-Robin

|}

|}

Final standing

</onlyinclude>

Awards

Most Valuable Player
  Tandara Caixeta
Best Setter
  María Marín
Best Outside Spikers
  Ángela Leyva
  Natália Pereira

Best Middle Blockers
  Julieta Lazcano
  Ana Carolina da Silva
Best Opposite Spiker
  Dayana Segovia
Best Libero
  Camila Gómez

See also

 South American Men's Volleyball Championship
 Women's U22 South American Volleyball Championship
 Women's Junior South American Volleyball Championship
 Girls' Youth South American Volleyball Championship
 Girls' U16 South American Volleyball Championship
 Volleyball at the Pan American Games
 Women's Pan-American Volleyball Cup

References

External links
Official website

Women's South American Volleyball Championships
South American Volleyball Championship
Voll
Sport in Cali
International volleyball competitions hosted by Colombia
2017 in South American sport
Volleyball